The former French Roman Catholic diocese of Agde existed from about the 6th century to the Concordat of 1801 between First Consul Napoleon Bonaparte and Pope Pius VII.  Agde is in the south of France, in what is now the department of Hérault.  The last bishop, Charles François de Rouvroy de Saint Simon Sandricourt, was guillotined in Paris on July 25, 1794.

The diocesan seat  was the Cathedral of Saint-Étienne, originally dedicated to Saint Andrew.  The cathedral was served by a Chapter, consisting of twelve Canons, including the Archdeacon, the Sacristan, the Precentor and the Treasurer.  There were twelve chaplains (hebdomidarii), eight for daily services and four for requiems.  There were thirty-two prebendaries.  The diocese had only twenty-six parishes. The territory of the former diocese is now part of the diocese of Montpellier.

Bishops

To 1000

Venustus (Venuste, in French) ca. 405
Beticus ca. 450?
Sophronius (Sophrone) 506
Leo 541
Pronimius (Fronime) ca. 569–ca. 585
Tigride  589
George  653
Wilesinde 673
Primus (Prime) 683
Justus (Just) 788, 791
Dagobert I. (Dagbert, Agbert) 848–872
Boson 885–897
Gerard I. 899–922
Stephan I. 922
Dagobert II. 937–948
Bernhard I.  949
Salomon I. 954–957
Bernhard II.  958
Ameil 971
Salomon II. 972–976
Armand (Arnaud) 982
Stephan II. 990–1034

1000 to 1300

Wilhelm I 1043
Gontier 1050–1064
Bérenger 1068–1098
Bernard Déodat 1098–1122
Adelbert 1123–1129
Raimond de Montredon 1130–1142 (translated to Arles)
Ermengaud 1142–1149
Bérenger II 1149–1152
Pons 1152–1153
Adhémar 1153–1162
Wilhelm II. 1165–1173
Pierre Raimond 1173–1191 or 1192
Raimond de Montpellier 1192–1213
Pierre Poulverel (Pulverel) 1214
Thédise 1215–1233
Bertrand de Saint-Just 1233–1241
Chrétien 1242
Pierre Raimond de Fabre (Fabri) 1243–1270 or 1271
Pierre Bérenger de Montbrun 1271–1296
Raimond du Puy 1296–1327 or 1331

1300 to 1500

Bernard Géraud (de Girard) 1332–1337
Guillaume Hunaud de Lanta 1337–1341 or 1342
Pierre de Bérail de Cessac 1342–1353 or 1354
Arnaud Aubert 1354 (also bishop of Carcassonne)
Sicard D'Ambres de Lautrec 1354–1371 (also bishop of Béziers)
Hugues de Montruc 1371–1408
Cardinal Guy de Malesec 1409–1411 (administrator)
Philippe de Levis de Florensac 1411–1425 (also archbishop of Auch)
Bérenger Guilhot 1425–1426 (archbishop of Auch in 1408–1425)
Jean Teste 1426–1435 or 1436
Renaud de Chartres 1436–1439 (also archbishop of Reims)
Guillaume Charrier 1439–1440
Jean de Montmorin 1440–1448
Étienne de Roupt de Cambrai 1448–1460 or 1462
Charles de Beaumont 1462–1470 or 1476
Jacques Minutoli 1476–1490
Nicolas Fieschi 22 October 1488 – 1494 (later bishop of Fréjus)
Jean de Vesc 1494–1525

From 1500

Jean-Antoine de Vesc 1525–1530 (later bishop of Valence)
Cardinal François Guillaume de Castelnau de Clermont-Lodève 1530–1540 Uncle of Jean-Antoine de Vesc
Claude de La Guiche  1541 or 1540–1546 (later bishop of Mirepoix)
Gilles Bohier 1546 or 1547–1561
Aimery de Saint-Sévérin  1561–1578
? Pierre de Conques
Bernard du Puy 1578 or ca. 1583 – 1601 or 1611
Louis de Valois 1612–1622  (illegitimate son of King Charles IX of France)
Balthazar de Budos de Portes 1622–1629
Fulcran de Barrès  1629–1643
Jean Dolce 13–26 June 1643
François Fouquet 1643–1656 (also archbishop of Narbonne)
Louis Fouquet 1656 or 1657–1702
Philibert-Charles de Pas de Feuquières 1702–1726
Claude Louis de La Châtre 1726–1740
Joseph-François de Cadente de Charleval 1740–1758 or 1759
Charles-François-Siméon de Vermandois de Saint-Simon de Rouvroy de Sandricourt 1759–1794

See also
Catholic Church in France
List of Catholic dioceses in France

Notes

Bibliography

Reference Works

 pp. 477–478.
  (in Latin) p. 76.
 (in Latin) p. 82.
 p. 97.
 p. 72.
 p. 72.
 p. 69.

Studies
 second edition (in French)

Agde
Agde